Rosaire Gauthier (28 February 1904 – 15 December 1992) was a Canadian politician, the mayor of Chicoutimi, Quebec  and a Liberal party member of the House of Commons of Canada. He was born in Chicoutimi, Quebec and became a businessman and industrialist.

Gauthier was mayor of Chicoutimi from 1950 to 1964. During this time, he was elected at the Chicoutimi riding in the 1957 general election. After serving his only federal term, the 23rd Canadian Parliament, he was defeated by Vincent Brassard of the Progressive Conservative party in the 1958 election.

References

External links
 

1904 births
1992 deaths
Members of the House of Commons of Canada from Quebec
Liberal Party of Canada MPs
Politicians from Saguenay, Quebec